Nice People was a 1921 Broadway four-act comedy written and staged by Rachel Crothers, produced by Samuel H. Harris and starring Tallulah Bankhead and Francine Larrimore. After working with Bankhead in 39 East, Crothers wrote Nice People expressly for her. The general manager was William G. Norton, the scenic was designed by Navon Bergman, and John Kirkpatrick was the stage manager. It ran for 120 performances from March 2, 1921 to June, 1921, at the Klaw Theatre. It was included in Burns Mantle's The Best Plays of 1920-1921. It was also Katharine Cornell's Broadway debut.

It was adapted into the 1922 silent film Nice People, now believed to be lost.

Cast

 Martin Alsop as Hubert Gloucester
 Francine Larrimore as Theodora Gloucester
 Tallulah Bankhead as Hallie Livingston	
 Vincent Coleman as Billy Wade	
 Katharine Cornell as Eileen Baxter-Jones	
 Charles Gibney as Mr. Heyfer	
 Edwin Hensley as Trevor Leeds	
 Hugh Huntley as Scottie Wilbur		
 Merle Maddern as Margaret Rainsford	
 Guy Milham as Oliver Comstock

References

 
 University of Texas Arlington Library Theatre

External links 
 The full text of Nice People at the Internet Archive
 

1921 plays
Broadway plays
Plays set in New York City
American plays adapted into films